Estinnes is a municipality of Wallonia located in the province of Hainaut, Belgium.

On 1 January 2006 Estinnes had a total population of 7,413. The total area is 72.73 km2 which gives a population density of 102 inhabitants per km2.

The municipality consists of the following districts: Croix-lez-Rouveroy, Estinnes-au-Mont, Estinnes-au-Val, Faurœulx, Haulchin, Peissant, Rouveroy, Vellereille-les-Brayeux, and Vellereille-le-Sec.

Estinnes was the location, on 1 March 744, of the second reform council organized by Saint Boniface.

Near Estinnes is a wind farm with 11 wind turbines of Enercon E-126 type, 198.5 metres (651 ft) high.

References

External links
 

Municipalities of Hainaut (province)